Sam Brittain (born May 10, 1992) is a Canadian former professional ice hockey goaltender who played in the American Hockey League (AHL). He most notably played as a prospect within the Florida Panthers organization of the National Hockey League (NHL). He was selected by the Panthers in the 4th round (92nd overall) of the 2010 NHL Entry Draft.

Playing career
Brittain played collegiate hockey for the Denver Pioneers in the NCAA Men's Division I National Collegiate Hockey Conference (NCHC). In his senior year, Brittain's outstanding play was rewarded with a selection to the inaugural 2013–14 All-NCHC First Team.

At the conclusion of his entry-level contract with the Panthers, Brittain was not tendered a qualifying offer and was released to free agency. On August 21, 2017, Brittain signed a one-year AHL contract in a return to the San Antonio Rampage.

Career statistics

Awards and honours

References

External links 

1992 births
Living people
Canadian ice hockey goaltenders
Canmore Eagles players
Cincinnati Cyclones (ECHL) players
Colorado Eagles players
Denver Pioneers men's ice hockey players
Florida Panthers draft picks
Manchester Monarchs (ECHL) players
Portland Pirates players
San Antonio Rampage players
Ice hockey people from Calgary
Springfield Thunderbirds players
AHCA Division I men's ice hockey All-Americans